Upson is an unincorporated community located in Iron County, Wisconsin, United States. Upson had an Air Defense Command radar station of the Permanent System radar network (P-16B) and a post office, which closed on March 16, 1985. One of the three people that surveyed the area was named Upson.

Images

References

Permanent System radar stations
Unincorporated communities in Iron County, Wisconsin
Unincorporated communities in Wisconsin